Cymindis laticollis is a species of ground beetle in the subfamily Harpalinae. It was described by Thomas Say in 1830.

References

laticollis
Beetles described in 1830